The Segona Divisió (Second Division), or Lliga UNIDA for sponsorship reasons, is the second-highest level of men's football in Andorra.

Former FC Santa Coloma reserve team were renamed UE Santa Coloma for 2007–08 (therefore eligible for promotion) and finally gained access to the Primera Divisió after finishing top place.

Penya Encarnada d'Andorra are the current holders, having won the 2021–22 title and earning promotion to the Primera Divisió.

Stadiums
The Andorran Football Federation organizes the matches of Primera Divisió and Segona Divisió in the stadiums owned by the local federation. Also the federation distributes the stadiums and fields for the training sessions for each team.

Location of stadiums

2020–21 clubs

Previous winners

1Club dissolved after season, runner-up was promoted.

2Club ineligible for promotion, runner-up was promoted.

Performance by club

Topscorers

References

External links
 UEFA.com - Andorra
 Federació Andorrana de Fútbol
 League321.com - Andorran football league tables, records & statistics database.
segona divisio summary(SOCCERWAY)

 
2
And
1999 establishments in Andorra
Sports leagues established in 1999